God Forbid a Worse Thing Should Happen (Ne dao Bog većeg zla) is a 2002 Croatian film directed by Snježana Tribuson. It is based on a novel of the same name by Goran Tribuson.

Cast
 Luka Dragić - Frula
 Mirjana Rogina - Nevenka
 Ivo Gregurević - Branko  
 Goran Navojec - Emil 
 Semka Sokolović-Bertok - Ruža
 Bojan Navojec - Zumzo
 Borko Perić - Kompa
 Dora Fišter - Hana 
 Hana Hegedušić - Cica

References

External links
 

2002 films
2000s Croatian-language films
Films based on Croatian novels
Croatian drama films
Films set in the 1960s
2002 drama films